Eddy Rodríguez (born August 8, 1981) is a former Major League Baseball relief pitcher. In , Rodríguez pitched for the Florida Marlins organization.
He also pitched for the Baltimore Orioles organization, where he spent most of his time in the club's Triple-A affiliate team, the Ottawa Lynx.

External links
 Career statistics and player information from MLB, or Baseball Reference, or Retrosheet, or Baseball Reference (Minors, Dominican and Italian leagues)

1981 births
Living people
Albuquerque Isotopes players
Baltimore Orioles players
Bowie Baysox players
Delmarva Shorebirds players
Dominican Republic expatriate baseball players in Canada
Dominican Republic expatriate baseball players in Italy
Dominican Republic expatriate baseball players in the United States
Fortitudo Baseball Bologna players
Frederick Keys players
Gulf Coast Orioles players

Major League Baseball pitchers
Major League Baseball players from the Dominican Republic
Ottawa Lynx players
Sportspeople from San Pedro de Macorís
Tigres del Licey players